Kosanović is originally a Montenegrin family name. Many Serbs and Croats have this surname. It may refer to:

Marica Kosanović (Tesla) (born 1858)
Sava Kosanović (Tesla) (born 1894), politician
Milan Kosanović (born 1933), rugby player
Milorad Kosanović (born 1951), football player and manager
Miloš Kosanović (born 1990), footballer
Zoran Kosanović (1956–1998), table tennis player
Jim, Gerry, Joe Kosanović (born 1948, Oregon Oldest Identical Triplets)

Serbian surnames
Croatian surnames
Slavic-language surnames
Patronymic surnames